The 23rd annual Nuestra Belleza México pageant held on March 11, 2017. Contestants from around Mexico competed for the national title, which was won by Denisse Franco from Sinaloa who will compete at Miss Universe 2017. Denisse was crowned by outgoing Nuestra Belleza México titleholder Kristal Silva. Denisse is the third Sinaloa to win this title.

Results

Nuestra Belleza México

Contestants
32 contestants have been confirmed:

Replacements
 – Estefania Carrillo was the winner of Nuesta Belleza Nayarit 2016 but resigned from the title because of personal reasons. The Suplente/1st Runner-up, Joselyn Preciado will represent Nayarit in Nuestra Belleza México 2017.
 – Diana Leal was the winner of Nuestra Belleza Puebla 2016. The Suplente/1st Runner-up, Carmen Cabildo obtained the title after Diana Leal was dethroned for undisclosed reasons.

Returning states
Last competed in 2014:

Crossovers
Contestants who have competed or will compete at other beauty pageants:

Miss Earth México
 2014: : Rebeca Pérez Amor
  Tamaulipas's representative
 2014: : Andrea Zenteno.  (First runner-up)

 2014: : Yareli Carrillo          (Winner)

Nuestra Belleza Coahuila
 2015: : Kikey Sato 

Nuestra Belleza Tamaulipas
 2013: : Rebeca Pérez Amor

Miss Earth Tamaulipas
 2014: : Rebeca Pérez Amor (Winner)

Srta Perla del Guadiana
 2016: : Alejandra Maldonado (Winner)

References

http://hpdiario.com.mx/noticias2.php?idn=18330

External links
Official Website

2017 beauty pageants
March 2017 events in Mexico
2017